The 22nd New Zealand Parliament was a term of the New Zealand Parliament. Its composition was determined by the 1925 election, and it sat until the 1928 election.

Historical context
The 22nd Parliament saw the Reform Party's Gordon Coates continue his rule as Prime Minister, in the continuing Reform Government.

The 22nd Parliament consisted of 80 representatives chosen by geographical electorates: 46 from North Island electorates, 30 from South Island electorates, and four Māori electorates. The Parliament was elected using the First Past the Post electoral voting system.

In 1926, the Reform candidate Sir James Gunson was expected to "romp home" in the Eden by-election. Reform had 55 seats. But with National (Liberal) having 11 seats plus two Liberal-leaning independents and Labour 12, Labour realised their chance to be the official Opposition, "threw their all" into the contest, and became the official Opposition; helped by Ellen Melville standing as Independent Reform. In 1927 a Labour farmer Lee Martin won the Raglan by-election against a weak Reform candidate plus Country Party, Liberal and Independent Reform candidates.

Parliamentary sessions
The Parliament sat for three sessions:

Party standings

Start of Parliament

End of Parliament

Initial composition of the 22nd Parliament

By-elections during 22nd Parliament
There were a number of changes during the term of the 22nd Parliament.

Notes

References

New Zealand parliaments